Sakharny is a rural locality (a khutor) in Frunzenskoye Rural Settlement, Sredneakhtubinsky District, Volgograd Oblast, Russia. The population was 169 as of 2010. There are 10 streets.

Geography 
Sakharny is located 23 km west of Srednyaya Akhtuba (the district's administrative centre) by road. Peschanka is the nearest rural locality.

References 

Rural localities in Sredneakhtubinsky District